JWE or Jwe can refer to:

 Jwé, a form of dance in Saint Lucia
 The Journal of Wine Economics (JWE) published by the American Association of Wine Economists
 Jurassic World Evolution, a business simulation game based on the Jurassic Park film series
 JSON Web Encryption